Into the Great Unknown is the fifth studio album by Swedish melodic hard rock band H.E.A.T. Released worldwide on 22 September 2017 by the label Gain (working with Sony Music) and produced by Tobias Lindell. The album has received praise from publications such as Louder.

Background and production details
The group's last album was 2014's Tearing Down the Walls. According to a press release, the band decided to record Into the Great Unknown in Bangkok, Thailand, having already come up with ten possible songs to use, and used the facilities of Karma Sound Studios. The release also stated that H.E.A.T took inspiration at the modern resurgence in public attention, particularly among young adults, of older artists considered "classic rock heroes" such as Foreigner, Journey, and Whitesnake.

It is the band's second release without a founding guitarist, in this case Eric Rivers.

In August 2017, the group released the track "Redefined" along with a music video depicting footage of H.E.A.T in the studio.

Reception

Writing for Louder, music critic Dom Lawson praised the release for featuring a "thrilling formula that made the Swedes’ previous albums such a goofy delight." He remarked that the "effervescent presence and towering voice of frontman Erik Grönwall make everything from... sound vital and timely without sacrificing any of that mid-80s sheen." Lawson concluded, "The best way to get drawn into H.E.A.T’s world of singalong euphoria is to catch them live, but this album will provide more than enough dizzying, life-affirming joy in the meantime."

Track listing

Personnel
 Erik Grönwall – vocals
 Dave "Sky Davis" Dalone – guitars
 Jonas "Jona Tee" Thegel – keyboards
 Jimmy "Jay" Johansson – bass
 Lars "Crash" Jarkell – drums

Charts

References

2017 albums
Albums produced by Tobias Lindell
H.E.A.T albums